Tortuga is the Spanish word for a turtle or tortoise. It may also refer to:

Geography

Islands
 Tortuga (Haiti), a Caribbean island that forms part of Haiti, off the northwest coast of Hispaniola, a pirate stronghold in the 17th-century
 Tortugas Banks, coral reefs in the Florida Keys National Marine Sanctuary
 Dry Tortugas, a group of islands in the Florida Keys in the United States
 Dry Tortugas National Park, a national park consisting of Fort Jefferson and the Dry Tortugas
 Isla Tortuga, a volcanic island in the Gulf of California, part of Baja California, Mexico
 La Tortuga Island, an uninhabited 156 km2 island in the Caribbean Sea that is a federal dependency of Venezuela
 Las Tortugas, name given by Christopher Columbus to Little Cayman and Cayman Brac

Places
 Freeport Tortuga, a free port project on Tortuga, Haiti, during the early 1970s
 Tortuga Bay, a bay on Santa Cruz Island in the Galapagos
 Tortuga, Nicaragra, Small town in southern pacific Region

Art, entertainment, and media

Film
 Tortuga Isle, a safe haven for fugitive pirates, featured prominently in Pirates of the Caribbean: The Curse of the Black Pearl (2003)

Television
 Tortuga (Breaking Bad), a fictional drug dealer in the AMC-TV drama, Breaking Bad
 Tortuga, a fictional aircraft in the children's television show Wild Kratts

Games
 Tortuga: Pirates of the New World, a computer game set in the Golden Age of Piracy era
 An island in the Assassin's Creed game Assassin's Creed Black Flag.
 An island in Etrian Odyssey III: The Drowned City, a turn-based role-playing game published for the Nintendo DS.
 Tortuga: A Pirate's Tale, a turn-based ship combat strategy game set in the Caribbean published for the Nintendo Switch, Microsoft Windows, Xbox Series X and Series S, and PlayStation 5.

Literature
 Tortuga, a novel by Rudolfo Anaya
 Far Tortuga, a 1975 novel by Peter Matthiessen

Sports
 Coliseo La Tortuga, an indoor sporting arena in Talcahuano, Chile
 Daytona Tortugas, a Class A-Advanced minor league baseball team in the Florida State League.

Transportation
 Tortuga (vehicle), a Venezuelan armored vehicle
 , later called SS Tortuga, a turbo-electric liner
 , a Casa Grande-class dock landing ship commissioned in 1945, in action during the Korean War and the Vietnam War, and decommissioned in 1970
 , a Whidbey Island-class dock landing ship commissioned in 1990 and on active service as of 2012

Other uses
 Tortuga (cocktail), a non-alcoholic cocktail beverage
 Tortuga (software), a software framework for discrete event simulation